Modern Philosophy: An Introduction and Survey is a 1994 book by the English philosopher Roger Scruton, in which the author tries to "acquaint the reader with the principal arguments, concepts and questions of modern philosophy, as this subject is taught in English-speaking universities."

Reception
The book has been reviewed by Anthony O'Hear, Jane O'Grady and Steven Ross.

References

External links

1994 non-fiction books
Contemporary philosophical literature
English non-fiction books
English-language books
Works by Roger Scruton
Books about René Descartes
Books about Ludwig Wittgenstein
Works about Martin Heidegger
Works about Jean-Paul Sartre
Works about Edmund Husserl
Books about Georg Wilhelm Friedrich Hegel
Books about Karl Marx
Works about Baruch Spinoza
Works about David Hume
Works about Gottfried Wilhelm Leibniz
Books about Søren Kierkegaard
Books about Immanuel Kant
Sinclair-Stevenson books
Penguin Books books